In Transparency International's 2022 Corruption Perceptions Index, which scored 180 countries on a scale from 0 ("highly corrupt") to 100 ("very clean"), Bahrain scored 44. When ranked by score, Bahrain ranked 69th among the 180 countries in the Index, where the country ranked first is perceived to have the most honest public sector.  For comparison, the best score was 90 (ranked 1), the worst score was 12 (ranked 180), and the average score was 43.

Bahrain became a party with United Nations Convention against Corruption in 2010 after signing it in 2005.

Statistical evaluations

Scores are on a 0-100 scale, with 0 being a perception of very low public sector honesty and 100 being a perception of very high public sector honesty.

Notable incidents of fraud and corruption

Alcoa-Alba corruption case, a $6m bribe case.

See also 

 Bahrain Transparency Society
 International Anti-Corruption Academy
 Group of States Against Corruption
 International Anti-Corruption Day
 ISO 37001 Anti-bribery management systems
 United Nations Convention against Corruption
 OECD Anti-Bribery Convention
 Transparency International

References

 
Bahrain